The Saloon, located at 1232 Grant Avenue in North Beach, is one of if not the oldest operational taverns in San Francisco.

History 

The Saloon first opened in 1861, and was originally owned by Ferdinand E. Wagner. Wagner was the son of a liquor merchant from Stundwiller Bas-Rhin, France. In 1836 Wagner migrated to Louisiana, married a native of Cannes nine years later, to eventually open a saloon there. By 1852 Wagner had reloacted to San Francisco, to first work as a hotel manager and then as a fruit vendor. His family later rejoined him in San Francisco, and by 1868 he opened Wagner's Beer Hall at 308 Dupont Street. When Dupont Street was renamed as Grant Avenue, the tavern's address changed to 1232 Grant Ave. Wagner and his family though lived in the two floors above the bar, and one of his sons would continue to operate the business after he retired. Wagner's Beer Hall was eventually renamed as simply the Saloon. 

The Saloon's wooden bar, was constructed outside of the US, shipped to San Francisco and installed in 1860. Located in the North Beach neighborhood of San Francisco, the Saloon continues to maintain a sense of similarity with its original 1870s asthetic.

Notable performers 
Several talented and famous musicians have performed at the venue. The following is a partial list of who either got their start or had performances at The Saloon:
James Cotton
Boz Scaggs
Paul Butterfield
John Cipollina
Janis Joplin
Charlie Musselwhite 
Steve Miller
Tommy Castro
Johnny Nitro

Appearances in other media
The Saloon later featured in a 1975 episode of "The Streets of San Francisco" called "Poisoned Snow". Actors from the show such as  Michael Douglas, Karl Malden and Anthony Geary filmed scenes inside the bar.

See also
1906 San Francisco earthquake
Barbary Coast
Gold Rush of 1849
Jackson Square
North Beach
Telegraph Hill
The Blues

References

External links
 

Music venues in San Francisco
North Beach, San Francisco
Drinking establishments in the San Francisco Bay Area
Restaurants in San Francisco
Restaurants established in 1861
1861 establishments in California
19th century in San Francisco
Saloons